Gustaf Eric Carlberg (5 April 1880 – 14 August 1963) was a Swedish Army officer, diplomat, sport shooter, fencer, and modern pentathlete who competed at the 1906, 1908, 1912 and 1924 Olympics alongside his twin brother Vilhelm.

Biography
Eric and Vilhelm were the youngest of four children of a veterinarian, who died when they were 12 years old. The twins became military officers in 1901 and retired in the rank of major. In 1911 they became physical education instructors. In 1924 Eric married Elsa Lindell and was stationed for three years in Iran as part of the newly established Gendarmerie corps. In 1930 he was appointed as Swedish consul general in Tehran and between 1935 and 1958 served as the Finnish consul general there.

Olympic career
1906 Athens
 25 m rapid fire pistol – eleventh place
 30 m duelling pistol – 13th place
 20 m duelling pistol – 14th place
 50 m pistol – 18th place
 25 m army pistol (1873 model) – 18th place
 25 m army pistol (standard model) – 27th place
 300 m army rifle – 28th place
 Free rifle, free position – 29th place

1908 London

Carlberg was a member of the Swedish team that won the silver medal in the team small-bore rifle competition. He also participated in the following shooting events:

 Team pistol – fifth place
 disappearing target small-bore rifle – ninth place
 moving target small-bore rifle – 15th place
 individual pistol – 33rd place

He also participated in the épée competition but was eliminated in the first round. As member of the Swedish épée team he was eliminated in the first round of the team épée event.

1912 Stockholm

At the 1912 Summer Olympics he won two gold and two silver medals in shooting. He also participated in the following shooting events:

 30 metre rapid fire pistol – sixth place
 50 metre pistol – twelfth place
 50 metre rifle, prone – 17th place
 25 metre small-bore rifle – 20th place

As member of the Swedish épée team he finished fourth in the team épée competition.

He also participated in the modern pentathlon event but retired after the first contest. This was the shooting competition where he finished eighth.

1924 Paris

In 1924 he finished ninth in the 25 metre rapid fire pistol event.

See also
 Dual sport and multi-sport Olympians

References

External links
 
 Eric Carlberg at Database Olympics

1880 births
1963 deaths
Swedish Army officers
Swedish twins
People from Karlskrona
Consuls-general of Sweden
Swedish male sport shooters
ISSF rifle shooters
ISSF pistol shooters
Swedish male épée fencers
Swedish male modern pentathletes
Swedish expatriates in Iran
Olympic shooters of Sweden
Olympic fencers of Sweden
Olympic modern pentathletes of Sweden
Shooters at the 1906 Intercalated Games
Shooters at the 1908 Summer Olympics
Shooters at the 1912 Summer Olympics
Shooters at the 1924 Summer Olympics
Fencers at the 1908 Summer Olympics
Fencers at the 1912 Summer Olympics
Modern pentathletes at the 1912 Summer Olympics
Olympic gold medalists for Sweden
Olympic silver medalists for Sweden
Olympic medalists in shooting
Medalists at the 1908 Summer Olympics
Medalists at the 1912 Summer Olympics
Iranian Gendarmerie personnel
Sportspeople from Blekinge County